Kari Tapani Liuhto (b. 26 December 1967 in Joutseno) is a professor of international business and the Director of the Pan-European Institute and the Centrum Balticum Foundation. Liuhto is also the editor-in-chief of the English-language review called as Baltic Rim Economies and of the Finnish-language Pulloposti column series.

Education 
Kari Liuhto completed his matriculation examination at the Joutsenon lukio in the spring of 1986. After the obligatory military service (course 183 at the Finnish Reserve Officer School), Liuhto began his studies at the Turku School of Economics in the autumn of 1987. At the same time, Liuhto got the right to study at the Kyiv State University, where he studied the Russian philology. In the spring of 1988 Liuhto returned from Kyiv to the Turku School of Economics where he graduated in 1991. Liuhto began his doctoral studies at the University of Glasgow in the United Kingdom in 1993 where he defended his dissertation three years later, earning his Ph.D. In 2000, Liuhto completed his doctorate in international business at the Turku School of Economics. Liuhto's first doctoral dissertation dealt with the economic transformation in the newly independent Estonia and the second doctorate was on the managerial change in six former Soviet republics.

Academic career 
Kari Liuhto started as an assistant at the Institute for East-West Trade at the Turku School of Economics on 15 March 1991. Liuhto served in numerous academic positions at the Turku School of Economics before starting as a professor at the Lappeenranta University of Technology at the end of 1997. The Lappeenranta University of Technology nominated Liuhto as a full professor in January 2000. Liuhto worked in Lappeenranta through the autumn of 2003 when he was invited to hold a chair in international business at the Turku School of Economics and the post of Director of the Pan-European Institute. Since August 2011, Liuhto has also served as part-time director of the Centrum Balticum Foundation, in addition to the tasks mentioned earlier.

Research and teaching work 
Kari Liuhto's research work focuses on the business development in Eastern Europe (especially in Ukraine and Russia), foreign direct investments, and the socio-economic development of the Baltic Sea region. He has published numerous articles on the aforementioned themes. Alongside his own research work, Liuhto has directed numerous research projects financed by bodies such as the European Commission, the Academy of Finland, the Prime Minister's Office, and several Finnish government ministries. Liuhto has also been used as an expert by several committees in the Finnish Parliament.

Awards and honours 
 The Cross of the Finnish Boarder Guard for Outstanding Military Service, May 1987 (Sissiristi)
 Knight, First Class, of the Order of the White Rose of Finland, December 2007
 Honorary doctorate from the Saint Petersburg State University of Economics (FINEC/UNECON), September 2011 - Liuhto gave up this tribute after Russia started massive military campaign against Ukraine in late February 2022.

References

Kari Liuhto 

1967 births
Living people